Westy is a suburban district in Warrington, England. It lies between the River Mersey and the Manchester Ship Canal. The village of Westy is a suburban area, itself unofficially a suburb of Latchford. The area features mainly inter-war council housing, however some of these homes are now privately owned.  There is an apparent strong community spirit with its hub at the community centre and also a thriving community hall based within St Margaret's Community Centre on Lindley Avenue, hosting activities for all age groups.

References

Geography of Warrington